Cohenite is a naturally occurring iron carbide mineral with the chemical structure (Fe, Ni, Co)3C. This forms a hard, shiny, silver mineral which was named by E. Weinschenk in 1889 after the German mineralogist Emil Cohen, who first described and analysed material from the Magura meteorite found near Slanica, Žilina Region, Slovakia. Cohenite is found in rod-like crystals in iron meteorites. 

On Earth cohenite is stable only in rocks which formed in a strongly reducing environment and contain native iron deposits. Such conditions existed in some places where molten magmas invaded coal deposits, e.g. on Disko Island in Greenland, or at the Bühl near Kassel in Germany.

Associated minerals include native iron, schreibersite, troilite and wustite.

Similar iron carbides occur also in technical iron alloys and are called cementite.

See also
 Glossary of meteoritics
List of minerals
List of minerals named after people

References 

Carbide minerals
Iron minerals
Meteorite minerals
Orthorhombic minerals
Minerals in space group 62
Native element minerals